Norma Viola (1934–2004) was an Argentine dancer.

Selected filmography
 Story of a Poor Young Man (1968)

1934 births
2004 deaths
People from Córdoba Province, Argentina
Argentine female dancers